442oons is a YouTube channel, set up by Dean Stobbart, that focuses on animated parodies of various football matches. Stobbart now works with Onefootball, Bundesliga, and many other footballing brands to make weekly videos on their channels.

History 
The channel's creator, Dean Stobbart, originally a teacher from Norton, County Durham, had in the past been a part-time voice actor who also did some animation for his lessons. He said he saw a gap in the market that "no one had really done football cartoons before", so he made his first animated video, a parody of Uruguayan footballer Luis Suárez and then-Arsenal manager Arsène Wenger in a cartoon parody of a scene from The Silence of the Lambs in August 2013. The video currently has 2.6 million views and was followed up with another Suárez-themed video (this time, a parody of the 1995 film Seven) which has received more than 17.5 million views. Since then, he has worked with organisations such as TalkSport and Sky Sports on animations. His videos have also been featured on Metro and the Spanish Marca He said in an interview with Tubefilter that his next goal is to have two million subscribers (which he reached in July 2018).

Although Stobbart had originally created his videos by himself, he hired three animators, Sam Dunscombe, Mike Myler and James Williams. Dunscombe and Stobbart have also been featured in some other videos, where they play mobile games such as Online Soccer Manager. In 442oons' 3-million-subscribers video in July 2020, Sam confirmed his departure from the channel. Currently with 4 animators, Lauren Bagstaff and Karl Hargreaves are the additional two animators with Myler and Williams. The current most popular video on the channel is the MSN SONG (a parody of 3 by Britney Spears), published in 2015, with 27.7 million views.

In July 2017, Stobbart created a new YouTube channel parodying the celebrity world called Celebri2oons. The channel never really took off so he does not upload often. On 24 April 2019, he launched a game called "442oons Football Runner" which features fusions of football players. On 4 July 2020, Stobbart launched a second mobile game called "442oons Football Shooter". He also has been in partnership with the Bundesliga YouTube channel (English), Onefootball, The Football Republic, FREEbets and other YouTube channels.

Favourite club 
Stobbart has yet to reveal his favourite football club to his fans yet, though over the years, he's said a lot of things about certain teams which fans think could be clues. A common red herring (or running gag) that Stobbart often throws into his videos is his use of the double entendre "My money's on Man City!", even when the fixture or tournament doesn't feature the club.

There have also been many references to him supporting Manchester United, such as one of the exchanges in his video A-Z of 442oons, where Stobbart tries to say: "My favorite club, I'm not telling you", however is interrupted by his character of Zlatan Ibrahimovic who says "Spoiler it's man U".

When Stobbart's channel hit 1 million subscribers, he made a special video of several 442oons characters video calling him, and at the end of the video Roary the Lion (Middlesbrough's mascot) calls him a 'Boro lad implying that Stobbart is either from or supports Middlesbrough. Stobbart later admitted on a live stream that he went to Middlesbrough games when he was younger however also said he wasn't a fan when he went.

Another reference of him supporting another team comes during his 442oons Onefootball Transfer Show series, where in a few episodes Stobbart mentions how you can follow your favourite teams/players on the Onefootball app. When showing this feature, viewers can see he has his favourite team selected as Sunderland, which a viewer spotted and commented "NO WAY THAT DEAN IS A MACKEM" to which Stobbart's 442oons channel replied with "ummm....". Also during this series, Stobbart talked about how Lionel Messi signing a new contract for Barcelona ruled him out of a move to Sunderland.

It's well known that Stobbart likes to trick his fans when it comes to his favourite club team, however it can be assumed that in terms of international football, Stobbart is a fan of England. In the same video where Stobbart had his favourite team set as Sunderland, he had his favourite national team selected as Albania so it's believed to be nothing more than a joke.

Awards and nominations

Football Content Awards

References

Association football animation
YouTube channels launched in 2013
Sports YouTubers
YouTube animators
1981 births
Living people